Mishka Yaponchik (born Moisei Wolfovich Vinnitsky; 30 October 1891 – 29 July 1919) was an Odesa gangster, Jewish revolutionary, and a Soviet military leader.

Early years
Moisey Volfovich Vinnitsky was born into the family of a Jewish wagon-builder, Meyer-Volf Mordkovich Vinnitsky, according to some records in stanitsa Golta (today is part of Pervomaisk). Vinnitsky was around 4 years old when his family moved to Odesa (Moldavanka). Other records state that he was born into the family of a seaport serviceman (bindyuzhnik) at 23 Hospital Street (today Bohdan Khmelnytsky Street) in Odesa (Moldavanka). Vinnitsky's mother, Doba Zelmanovna, gave birth to five sons and a daughter. Upon his birth he received a double name, Moisey-Yakov (Moses-Jacob), similar to his father. Because such a double name was uncommon in Russian culture, Vinnitsky's second name was sometimes recorded as the paternal name—Moisey Yakovlevich. Sometime in 1897 Mishka lost his father. At first he worked at a mattress factory as a trainee, while also attending the Jewish school (presumably cheder). Later, as an electrician, he received a job at the Anatra factory. At the time of the Jewish pogroms in October 1905 Vinnitsky participated in the Jewish self-defense. Later he joined the organization of anarchists-communists Molodaya Volya (Young Will). It was probably during that time that he received his famous street name, "Mishka the Japanese", presumably for the shape of his eyes. Another version suggests that he began to be recognized by this name after he narrated a story that he heard from a Portuguese sailor to his Odesa friends about a Japanese gang from Nagasaki. The story was about Japanese gangsters who set up rules for their "business" and never trespassed them. Yaponchik offered this example for his buddies to follow.

In 1907 Vinnitsky was sentenced to death by hanging for the assassination of the chief of the Mikhailov police precinct in Odesa V.Kozhukhar,. This sentence was later commuted to a term of 12 years' hard labor (katorga). According to legend, Vinnitsky made a special boot-shining box in which he placed explosives. Vinnitsky would sit on the corner of Dalnytska Street and Steep Street and ask passers-by if they wanted their boots cleaned. This activity was annoying the chief of the local precinct. One day, however, a slightly-inebriated precinct chief placed his boot on the cleaning box. After cleaning his boots, Vinnitsky lit the explosives and managed to run away, leaving his client to face his end. While serving time, Vinnitsky became acquainted with Grigoriy Kotovskiy.

Revolution
During the amnesty issued by the Russian Provisional Government in 1917 Yaponchik returned to his hometown (Odesa) where he organized his gang to the extent of nearly taking control of the city. During the evacuation from the city of the last retreating Austrian and German forces on 12 December 1918 Yaponchik made a successful raid on the city jail freeing numerous detainees. During the occupation of Odesa by the Entente forces (French, Greeks, and British) in 1919 he cooperated with the Bolshevik underground (including Kotovskiy). Yaponchik was also well acquainted with Naftaly Frenkel and Lazar Veyssbeyn (Leonid Utyosov) who later became one of the most popular singers in the Soviet Union and vouched for Yaponchik as a humane gangster (avoided killings, sponsored local artists). Once, to prevent his banditry, he was arrested by the counter-intelligence service (chief – General Shilling) of the Denikin's Volunteer Army. After about half an hour, his place of detention was visited by a cavalcade of phaetons and horse driven cabs (prolyotkas) with numerous gangsters holding grenades. Upon request to release Yaponchik the latter exited the building in less than 15 minutes.

Yaponchik is known for his aphorisms such as "Don't shoot in the air—don't leave witnesses", "The dead have the shortest tongues", "The dead won't sell out".

After Odesa was taken by the Red Army, some evidence suggests him being in charge of an armored train to defeat the Nykyfor Hryhoriv's mutiny.

54th Soviet Regiment
In May 1919 he was allowed to form his own military unit for the Soviet forces that fell under the command of the 3rd Ukrainian Soviet Army. The unit was later reformed into the 54th Lenin's Soviet Revolutionary Regiment. Yaponchik's assistant (adjutant) was Meyer Zayder, nicknamed Mayorchik (as diminutive of Major), who later killed Grigoriy Kotovskiy in 1925. The regiment consisted of Odesa's former convicts, anarchist militia, and the newly mobilized students of the Novorossiya University. The Red Army men of Yaponchik did not have a uniform, which was not uncommon in many military formations that were drafted by Bolsheviks. Many of them wore boaters and top hats; however, almost everyone considered to be honorary to wear what is known as telnyashka (a sailor's shirt).

The regiment was reassigned to Kotovskiy's Brigade under the command of the 45th division led by a Bessarabian Jew, Iona Yakir. In July 1919 Yaponchik's forces were engaged in a fight against the army of the Ukrainian People's Republic that were often exclusively associated with Symon Petliura, the Ukrainian national leader who led Ukraine's struggle for independence following the Russian Revolution of 1917. Yaponchik's men rendezvoused with the Ukrainians near the town of Birzula (today's Kotovsk), where they successfully managed to take the town of Vapnyarka in Podolie (near Vinnytsia, dozens of miles away), securing several military prisoners and trophies. However, after a counter-attack, the regiment fled and many soldiers deserted. What happened afterward is covered in mystery. There are some suggestions that the regiment mutinied, and, after securing a couple of trains, tried to return to Odesa. Another version of the story tells that the higher command tried to isolate Yaponchik from the rest of his troops and ordered him to head towards Kyiv. Yaponchik, however (with a company-size security) did not go to Kyiv, but rather turned towards Odesa. He was ambushed by the Cheka about a mile away from the town of Voznesensk and was killed in a clay quarry during the arrest by uyezd military commissar Nikifor Ursulov on 29 July 1919 at eight o'clock in the morning. His body was covered by sand. 
Later by the order #296 of the 12th Army Nikifor Ursulov was awarded the Order of the Red Banner.

Popular culture
The Yaponchik's cult of personality was so strong in Odesa that it was used as a prototype by Isaac Babel as Benya Krik in his "Odesa Tales". Traces of his personality can also be found in the artistic works of Alexander Rozenbaum.

A Ukrainian biographic television series based on Yaponchik's life, The Life and Adventures of Mishka Yaponchik (Жизнь и приключения Мишки Япончика), also titled internationally as Once Upon a Time in Odesa, was released in 2011.

References

External links 
 

1891 births
1919 deaths
Jewish socialists
Odesa Jews
Military personnel from Odesa
People from Odessky Uyezd
People of the Russian Civil War
Soviet Army officers
Ukrainian gangsters